Jason Pomeroy is an architect, academic, author He is the founder of sustainable design firm Pomeroy Studio and sustainable educator Pomeroy Academy.

Life 

Pomeroy studied at the Canterbury School of Architecture, took a master's degree at the University of Cambridge, and a PhD from the University of Westminster with a thesis titled ‘Skycourts and skygardens: towards a vertical urban theory’.

He teaches at James Cook University in Singapore at the Università Iuav di Venezia in Italy, at the University of Nottingham and the University of Cambridge in the United Kingdom.

Projects 

Pomeroy designed an energy-efficient house for Sime Darby Property in Malaysia, which used electricity generated by solar panels and rainwater collected from the roof amongst other green technologies. This project, the Idea House, was partly based on the traditional Malay kampong, and was built in 2010. In 2011 the design received a Green Mark Platinum rating from the Building and Construction Authority.

Another ecologicallydesigned house was built in Bukit Timah, in Singapore. "B House" drew on the architecture of colonial-era black-and-white bungalows. It used the same principles of solar power and water management as the Idea House was designed to remain cool without air-conditioning and was plus-energy. In 2014 the design received a Green Mark Platinum rating from the Building and Construction Authority.

Television 
Pomeroy presented seasons 1 and 2 of City Time Traveller, an architecture travel series, for Channel NewsAsia in 2014 and 2015. Also in 2015, he presented City Redesign, a four-part documentary on the architecture of Singapore, for the same channel. His eight-part series on smart cities, Smart Cities 2.0, was shown in 2017. He has also featured in short and long format documentaries for BBC, CNBC, and National Geographic.

Publications 

Pomeroy has written three books: 
 Idea House: Future Tropical Living Today (ORO Editions, 2011), 
 The Skycourt and skygarden: greening the urban habitat (Routledge, 2014)  
 Pod Off-Grid: Explorations Into Low-Energy Waterborne Communities ( ORO Editions, 2016) 
Cities of opportunities: connecting culture and innovation (ed.) (Routledge, 2020)

References

Living people
English people of Malaysian descent
21st-century English architects
Alumni of the University for the Creative Arts
Alumni of the University of Cambridge
Alumni of the University of Westminster
Academic staff of James Cook University
Academics of the University of Nottingham
Year of birth missing (living people)